Yan Tin is one of the 31 constituencies in the Tuen Mun District.

Created for the 2019 District Council elections, the constituency returns one district councillor to the Tuen Mun District Council, with an election every four years.

Yan Tin loosely covers areas surrounding Yan Tin Estate and San Hing Tsuen in Tuen Mun. It has projected population of 16,746.

Councillors represented

Election results

2010s

References

Tuen Mun
Constituencies of Hong Kong
Constituencies of Tuen Mun District Council
2019 establishments in Hong Kong
Constituencies established in 2019